The mangrove red snapper (Lutjanus argentimaculatus), also known as mangrove jack, grey snapper, creek red bream, Stuart evader, dog bream, purple sea perch, red bream, red perch, red reef bream, river roman, or rock barramundi, is a species of marine ray-finned fish, a snapper belonging to the family Lutjanidae. It has a wide Indo-Pacific range and has recently been recorded in the eastern Mediterranean Sea.

Taxonomy
The mangrove red snapper was first formally described in 1775 as Sciaena argentimaculata by the Swedish speaking Finnish born explorer and naturalist Peter Forsskål with the type locality given as the Red Sea. The specific name is a compound of argentum meaning “silver” and maculatus meaning “spots”, a possible reference to the white edging to each of the scales on this species.

Description

Coloration of the mangrove red snapper ranges from burnt orange, to copper, to bronze and dark reddish-brown, depending on its age and environment.  Younger fish caught in estuarine areas are often darker than older fish taken from offshore reef areas, and exhibit lighter vertical bands down their flanks.

Like other tropical snappers (family Lutjanidae), mangrove jacks  have prominent canine teeth in their jaws that are used for seizing and holding prey. These teeth can cause a nasty injury to unwary fishers.

In reef areas, mangrove red snappers are sometimes confused with two-spot red snapper or red bass (Lutjanus bohar), a known carrier of ciguatera toxin.  The red bass, however, is usually darker in coloration, has fewer dorsal-fin spines, scale rows on the back that rise obliquely from the lateral line, and a deep groove from the nostrils to the eyes.

Distribution and habitat
The mangrove red snapper is native to the Indian Ocean and the western Pacific Ocean from the African coast to Samoa and the Line Islands and from the Ryukyus in the north to Australia in the south.  It has also been rarely recorded in the Mediterranean Sea, having reached there from the Red Sea since 1979.

As its name implies, the mangrove red snapper is commonly found in mangrove-lined estuarine systems, however some also make their way into complete freshwater systems, particularly at a juvenile age. They are also known to migrate to offshore reefs to spawn. As they mature, mangrove red snappers move into open waters, sometimes hundreds of kilometers from the coast to breed.  These larger fish are sometimes caught by bottom-fishers with heavy tackle, though they still remain difficult to land due to their speed and proximity to sharp reef bottoms.

Diet
The species is carnivorous; they are predators, feeding mainly at night on fish, crustaceans, gastropods, and cephalopod molluscs. As ambush predators, they often dwell around mangrove roots, fallen trees, rock walls, and any other snag areas where smaller prey reside for protection.

Fisheries

Mangrove red snapper is a popular and important commercial and recreational fish throughout its range, and considered to be an excellent food fish.

For fishermen, the telltale sign of a hooked mangrove red snapper is the explosive run for cover once the bait (or lure) is taken.  Many fish (and so lures) are lost once they reach the protection of the snags as a result of their initial burst of speed.

The mangrove red snapper is a highly regarded table fish with firm, sweet-tasting, white flesh.  While often a nuisance species when targeting the infamous barramundi, many fisherman rate the eating qualities of the jack higher than it.

References

External links
 

Lutjanus
Marine fish of Northern Australia
Taxa named by Peter Forsskål
Fish described in 1775